"Hold Me" is a song written and recorded by American country music artist K. T. Oslin.  It was released in September 1988 as the second single from her album This Woman.  The song was Oslin's third number one on the country chart.  The single went to number one for one week and spent a total of fourteen weeks on the country chart.

Chart performance

References

K. T. Oslin songs
1988 singles
Song recordings produced by Harold Shedd
RCA Records Nashville singles
Songs written by K. T. Oslin
1988 songs